

S02A Anti-infectives

S02AA Anti-infectives
S02AA01 Chloramphenicol
S02AA02 Nitrofural
S02AA03 Boric acid
S02AA04 Aluminium acetotartrate
S02AA05 Clioquinol
S02AA06 Hydrogen peroxide
S02AA07 Neomycin
S02AA08 Tetracycline
S02AA09 Chlorhexidine
S02AA10 Acetic acid
S02AA11 Polymyxin B
S02AA12 Rifamycin
S02AA13 Miconazole
S02AA14 Gentamicin
S02AA15 Ciprofloxacin
S02AA16 Ofloxacin
S02AA17 Fosfomycin
S02AA18 Cefmenoxime
S02AA30 Antiinfectives, combinations
QS02AA57 Neomycin, combinations

S02B Corticosteroids

S02BA Corticosteroids
S02BA01 Hydrocortisone
S02BA03 Prednisolone
S02BA06 Dexamethasone
S02BA07 Betamethasone
S02BA08 Fluocinolone acetonide
QS02BA99 Corticosteroids, combinations

S02C Corticosteroids and anti-infectives in combination

S02CA Corticosteroids and anti-infectives in combination
S02CA01 Prednisolone and antiinfectives
S02CA02 Flumetasone and antiinfectives
S02CA03 Hydrocortisone and antiinfectives
S02CA04 Triamcinolone and antiinfectives
S02CA05 Fluocinolone acetonide and antiinfectives
S02CA06 Dexamethasone and antiinfectives
S02CA07 Fludrocortisone and antiinfectives
QS02CA90 Betamethasone and antiinfectives
QS02CA91 Mometasone and antiinfectives

S02D Other otologicals

S02DA Analgesics and anesthetics
S02DA01 Lidocaine
S02DA02 Cocaine
S02DA03 Phenazone
S02DA04 Cinchocaine
S02DA30 Combinations

S02DC Indifferent preparations

QS02Q Antiparasitics

QS02QA Antiparasitics
QS02QA01 Lindane
QS02QA02 Sulfiram
QS02QA03 Ivermectin
QS02QA51 Lindane, combinations

References

S02